John Desmond Hargreaves (25 January 1924 – 14 February 2015) was the Burnett-Fletcher Professor of History at the University of Aberdeen.

Hargreaves was noted for his work on the history of Africa; its colonisation and de-colonisation. His career at Aberdeen began in 1954 when he was appointed as a lecturer in History.  Hargreaves received his chair in 1962.

Hargreaves went part-time in 1982 and retired in 1985. A Festschrift was produced in his honour.

Hargreaves died on 14 February 2015 at the age of 91.

Selected publications
 Hargreaves, John D  (1967) West Africa: the former French states, Englewood Cliffs, N.J., Prentice-Hall

Festschrift 
 Bridges, Roy (1999) Imperialism, Decolonization and Africa: Studies Presented to John Hargreaves (Cambridge Imperial and Post-Colonial Studies Series) Basingstoke : Macmillan

References 

Academics of the University of Aberdeen
Historians of Africa
1924 births
2015 deaths